Roman Kratochvíl (born 24 June 1974) is a Slovak professional footballer who plays for his hometown club Inter Bratislava. He has also played for the Turkish League teams Denizlispor and Konyaspor.

In September 2009, having failed to secure a new contract and suffering from a chronic groin injury he decided to end his professional career.

Kratochvíl returned to football in 2010, when he joined his former team Inter Bratislava, then playing in the sixth tier of Slovak football. The team currently competes in III. liga Bratislava, the third tier in the Slovak football league system.

International career 
Kratochvíl made his international debut for Slovakia on 3 March 1999 in a friendly game against Bulgaria.

International goal
Score and result list Slovakia's goal tally first.

Honours

Inter
Corgoň Liga: 2000, 2001
Slovak Cup: 2000, 2001

References

External links

1974 births
Living people
Slovak footballers
Slovakia international footballers
Slovak expatriate footballers
Association football central defenders
Denizlispor footballers
Konyaspor footballers
FK Inter Bratislava players
Expatriate footballers in Turkey
Slovak Super Liga players
Süper Lig players
Slovak expatriate sportspeople in Turkey
Footballers from Bratislava